Anthony Parrino (born January 4, 1983), better known by his stage name Elite, is an American hip-hop and R&B record producer and recording artist best known for his work with J. Cole, Dreamville Records, and the Ruff Ryders recording label in the early 2000s. Elite is from Byram, Connecticut and resides in Brooklyn, New York.

Career
In mid 2000, Elite started working as an intern for Ruff Ryders Entertainment and eventually caught the ear of rapper Drag-On, placing his first produced song on the Cradle 2 the Grave soundtrack in 2002. Working as an in-house producer for Ruff Ryders, Elite went on to produce "Shoot Outs" for Jadakiss featuring Styles P from Kiss of Death as well as the "Why Remix" featuring Anthony Hamilton, Styles P, Common, and Nas. In 2004 Elite graduated cum laude from SUNY Purchase music conservatory studying Studio Production. In 2006 Elite produced "Wrong or Right (I'm Tired)" for DMX from the album Year of the Dog... Again.

In 2009, Elite began working with longtime friend and Roc Nation recording artist J. Cole on his mixtape The Warm Up. Elite produced "Heartache" and a good portion of the mixtape was recorded at his home studio in New York. In 2010, Elite released his first mixtape entitled "The Groundwork" which was a collection of all of his production work up to that point. The mixtape featured an unreleased J. Cole song titled "Playground". Elite also produced "See World" for J. Cole off of his third mixtape, Friday Night Lights. Elite co-produced J. Cole's first single "Who Dat" which was featured as an iTunes bonus on Cole World: The Sideline Story.

In 2011, Elite released his first project as an artist entitled "Awaken" which featured J. Cole, Omen, Voli and Sean McVerry.

Elite worked on multiple songs on J. Cole's second album Born Sinner, co-producing the title track "Born Sinner", and adding additional production to "Run Away". Cole sampled the song "Do She Got a Friend Tho?" from Elite's mixtape "Level Up" on the standout "Let Nas Down". In June 2013, J. Cole released his second single from Born Sinner titled "Crooked Smile" which was co-produced by Elite and features TLC.

Elite worked together with J. Cole once more on the song "Folgers Crystals" from the 2015 work Revenge Of The Dreamers II, he also produced the song "48 Laws" by Omen feat. Donnie Trumpet from the same album.

In December 2016, J. Cole released his fourth studio album 4 Your Eyez Only, which was co-executive produced by Elite.

In April 2018, J. Cole released his fifth studio album KOD, which featured co-production from Elite on a majority of the album.

In May 2019, Ari Lennox released her debut studio album Shea Butter Baby, executive produced by Elite. Two of the album's lead singles (released in 2018) were produced by Elite; Whipped Cream and the title track Shea Butter Baby (feat. J. Cole), first appearing on the Creed II Soundtrack.

Discography

Mixtapes
2010: The Groundwork
2011: Awaken
2013: Level Up

Production discography
List of songs as producer or co-producer, with performing artists and other credited producers, showing year released and album name.

* Indicates "Additional Production" credit

+ Indicates "Executive Production" credit

TV Scoring

References

External links

American hip hop record producers
Living people
Dreamville Records artists
1983 births